Pierre Spengler (born 5 June 1947) is a French film producer. He initiated the first three Superman films starring Christopher Reeve and produced them with Alexander and Ilya Salkind.

Overview

Pierre Spengler started in the movie industry in 1964. After being a producer in the Salkind Organisation from 1972 to 1985, he became an independent producer in 1986. He was also a consultant on the 1984 movie Supergirl.

In 2004, he acquired French publishing house Les Humanoïdes Associés in order to develop their properties in movies.

Filmography
 (1972) Bluebeard (executive in charge of production)
 (1973) The Three Musketeers (executive in charge of production)
 (1974) The Four Musketeers (producer)
 (1976) The Twist (producer)
 (1977) The Prince and the Pauper (producer)
 (1978) Superman (producer)
 (1980) Superman II (producer)
 (1983) Superman III (producer)
 (1985) Santa Claus: The Movie (producer)
 (1989) The Return of the Musketeers (producer)
 (1990) The Rainbow Thief (executive producer, uncredited)
 (1995) Underground (executive producer)
 (2005) Unleashed  (co-producer)
 (2006) Superman II: The Richard Donner Cut (producer)

External links
 

Interviews
 (in French) A July 2006 interview with Pierre Spengler – discuss the Superman movies and the Humanoïdes Associés buyout
 (in English) The same July 2006 interview – machine translation by Babel Fish

French film producers
Living people
1947 births